Poland–South Africa relations are the bilateral relations between the Republic of Poland and the Republic of South Africa. Both nations are members of the United Nations and the World Trade Organization.

History
In 1988, the first semi-official diplomatic contacts between Poland and South Africa took place. In April 1989, the Ministries of Foreign Affairs of both countries agreed on consular protection for the Polish diaspora in South Africa via the Polish embassy in Gaborone, Botswana. In 1990, an agreement was signed to establish Interests Bureaus in both Pretoria and in Warsaw. On 18 December 1991, diplomatic relations between both nations were formally established and both nations respective Interest Bureaus were upgraded to the rank of embassies.

In 1992, South African President F. W. de Klerk paid an official visit to Poland and met with Polish President Lech Wałęsa. In 2004, South African Deputy President Jacob Zuma paid a visit to Poland. In December 2013, Polish Prime Minister Donald Tusk, along with Foreign Minister Radosław Sikorski and former President Lech Wałęsa; paid a visit to South Africa to attend the funeral of former President Nelson Mandela. In 2014, South African Deputy President Kgalema Motlanthe also paid a visit to Poland.

Poland perceives South Africa as a priority partner in Africa, both in terms of bilateral relations and in the context of the strategic partnership between South Africa and the European Union. Since the establishment of diplomatic relations, both nations have worked together to strengthen bilateral cooperation as well as multilateral relations. Both countries have cooperated in many initiatives at the United Nations, especially in the field of human rights protection.

High-level visits

High-level visits from Poland to South Africa
 Foreign Minister Krzysztof Skubiszewski (1993)
 Foreign Minister Władysław Bartoszewski (1995)
 Undersecretary of State Mariusz Handzlik (2009)
 Prime Minister Donald Tusk (2013)
 Foreign Minister Radosław Sikorski (2013)

High-level visits from South Africa to Poland
 President F. W. de Klerk (1992)
 Foreign Minister Pik Botha (1992)
 Foreign Minister Alfred Baphethuxolo Nzo (1994)
 Deputy Foreign Minister Aziz Pahad (1996)
 Deputy President Jacob Zuma (2004)
 Foreign Undersecretary Susan van der Merwe (2007)
 Foreign Minister Maite Nkoana-Mashabane (2011)
 Deputy President Kgalema Motlanthe (2014)

Bilateral agreements
Both nations have signed several bilateral agreements such as an Agreement for the establishment of Permanent Office of Interests in both nations respective capitals (1990); Agreement on the abolition of visa requirements for holders of Diplomatic and Service Passports (1992); Agreement on Air Transportation (1993); Agreement for the Avoidance of Double Taxation with respect to Taxes on Income (1995); Agreement for a protocol on consultations between the Polish Ministry of Foreign Affairs and the South African Department of International Relations and Cooperation (1995); Agreement on Industrial, Technological and Commercial Cooperation within the scope of the Military Industries (1999) and an Agreement on Scientific and Technological Cooperation (1999).

Resident diplomatic missions
 Poland has an embassy in Pretoria.
 South Africa has an embassy in Warsaw.

See also
 Polish diaspora

References 

 
South Africa
Poland